Ramezan Hajjimashhadi  (Persian: رمضان حاجی مشهدی) is a prominent lawyer in Iran who has represented a number of well known political and human rights activists, journalist and authors.

Born in Kalajan village, west of Gorgan, Hajjimashhadi was arrested in 1975 during the reign of the Shah of Iran, and imprisoned for his leftist political leanings and activism. He was released in 1978.

Hajjimashhadi studied law at Tehran University. After receiving his degree, he practiced commercial law for some time, but he continued his political activism and defense of human rights. He has represented activists such as Nobel laureate Shirin Ebadi, renowned author Moniro Ravanipour and journalist Khalil Rostamkhani for their involvement in the Berlin Conference on Iran, and one of the most important modern Iranian poets, Ahmad Shamlou. Much of his work has been in defense of the freedom of expression, and in that role, he has represented a number of weekly magazines and newspapers in Iran that have been targeted by the regime such as Hambastegi, Mardom-Salari, and Nowrooz.

References 
 حاجي مشهدي وکيل پاليزدارشد
 Persian Wiki Entry

20th-century Iranian lawyers
Living people
Year of birth missing (living people)
People from Gorgan
21st-century Iranian lawyers